Evald Brunovich Frolov (born 9 March 1962) is a Russian football manager and a former player.

Personal life
His son Dainis Frolov is a footballer.

External links
 

1962 births
People from Volzhsky, Volgograd Oblast
Living people
Russian footballers
Russian football managers
FC Rotor Volgograd managers
Association football goalkeepers
Sportspeople from Volgograd Oblast